Gandour is a food processing company founded in Beirut, Lebanon in 1857, with headquarters in Jeddah, Saudi Arabia.

A manufacturer of confectioneries like hard boiled candies, the company started industrial level production in 1912, before expanding its operations to Saudi Arabia in 1956. Gandour is widely regarded as first manufacturer of chocolate and chewing gum in Saudi Arabia.

Currently, Gandour has manufacturing facilities in Saudi Arabia, Egypt, Lebanon, and India, and serves the area of the Middle East, North Africa and Southeast Asia.

References

 

Chocolate companies
Food and drink companies of Saudi Arabia
Food and drink companies of Lebanon
Companies established in 1857
Companies based in Jeddah
Companies based in Beirut